Grandin is an unincorporated community in Putnam County, Florida, United States. It is located near the State Road 100/County Road 315 intersection. As of the 2000 census, its population was 192.

Mostly known for its sand and rock plants, the hills in this area are part of a northern unconnected extension of the Lake Wales Ridge. Grandin is used heavily by Florida Rock Industries Inc. as a source of undifferentiated sand.

Geography

References

External links

 Florida Rock Industries Site

Unincorporated communities in Putnam County, Florida
Unincorporated communities in Florida